Mustapha Stambouli (March 10, 1920 in Mascara, Algeria – April 20, 1984 in Mascara, Algeria) was an Algerian nationalist leader.

A law student, he was active for the nationalist cause from the late 1930s in the Parti du peuple algérien (PPA), and was jailed several times by the colonial authorities of France. In 1948, he was arrested on the Libyan border, as he tried to join Arab guerrillas in Palestine. He joined the Front de libération nationale (FLN), and served as an officer in its armed wing, the Armée de libération nationale (ALN), during the Algerian War of Independence (1954–62). He eventually became a secretary of state in the Gouvernement provisoire de la republique algérienne (GPRA), an exile government set up by the FLN. Following independence in 1962, he was elected to the constituent assembly, but played no major political role after that.

There is now a university named after him in his hometown of Mascara, Algeria.

Algerian rebels
1920 births
1984 deaths
Algerian people of Turkish descent
Algerian People's Party politicians
National Liberation Front (Algeria) politicians
Members of the People's National Assembly
Algerian prisoners and detainees
Prisoners and detainees of France
People from Mascara, Algeria